The 30th District of the Iowa House of Representatives is located in the eastern portion of Polk County in the state of Iowa. It contains the cities of Altoona, Bondurant, Mitchellville, Elkhart and Runnells.

Current elected officials
Republican Brian Lohse is the representative currently representing the district.

Past representatives
The district has previously been represented by:
 Darwin V. Mayberry, 1971–1973
 James D. Jordan, 1973–1977
 Myron B. Oxley, 1977–1983
 Deo A. Koenigs, 1983–1993
 Keith Weigel, 1993–2001
 Brian Quirk, 2001–2003
 Richard E. Myers, 2003–2003
 David Jacoby, 2003–2013
 Joe Riding, 2013–2015
 Zach Nunn, 2015–2019
 Brian Lohse, 2019–present

References

030